John-Ben Kôtze (born 24 January 1993) is a South African professional rugby union player for the  in Super Rugby and the  in the Currie Cup. His regular position is centre, but he is also comfortable at wing.

Career

School

Kôtze attended Bishops College in Cape Town and played for their first XV in 2010 and 2011, where he played alongside Dillyn Leyds in 2010 and Tim Swiel in both 2010 and 2011.

2012–13

Kôtze's first provincial involvement came in 2012, when he was included in the  squad that participated in the 2012 Under-19 Provincial Championship. He also made a single appearance for the s in the same season.

2014–2015

The following year, he was a member of the  side that played in the 2014 Varsity Cup. He played in the first four of Maties' matches in this competition, scoring two tries. He then moved to the  squad that participated in the 2014 Vodacom Cup, where he made his first class debut by starting their 16–8 victory in the opening round of the competition. Kôtze also scored his first career try in Round Five of the competition, a 65–29 victory over Kenyan invitational side , eventually making a total of 6 starts.

Kôtze was a key figure for the  side that participated in the 2014 Under-21 Provincial Championship, starting eleven of their fourteen matches during the competition, including their semi-final victory over  – during which he scored one of seven tries during the season to help Western Province to a 41–17 victory – and the final, where they lost 10–20 to the s.

He played the entire 80 minutes of the match as the Stormers started their season in fine form by running out 29–17 winners in the match in Pretoria.

References

1993 births
Living people
Blue Bulls players
Bulls (rugby union) players
Ospreys (rugby union) players
Rugby union centres
Rugby union players from Carletonville
Rugby union wings
Shimizu Koto Blue Sharks players
South African rugby union players
Stormers players
Western Province (rugby union) players